Đilas or, old orthography Djilas is a surname and Serb clan originating in Montenegro from the Vojinović noble family.

People
Dragan Đilas (born 1967), Serbian politician and former mayor of Belgrade
Gordana Đilas (born 1958), Serbian poet, librarian and bibliographer
Milovan Đilas (1911-1995), Yugoslav politician and author
Vladimir Đilas (born 1983), Serbian footballer

Serbian surnames